Line 3 of Ningbo Rail Transit is a rapid transit line  in Ningbo. It starts from south Yinzhou District and ends in Datong Bridge Station in Jiangbei District. In the future extension plan, the line will further extend into Luotuo Area in Zhenhai District. The construction of the first section, from south Yinzhou to Datong Bridge, started on 23 December 2014.

Route 
Line 3 starts from Gaotang Bridge Station in south Yinzhou District as an underground line. Then it turns into east-west direction on Yinzhou Avenue and makes a further turn into Ningnan South Road and goes in north-south direction again until it reaches Songjiang Middle Road. Then it runs to northeast to Qiubi and then crosses the Ningbo–Taizhou–Wenzhou railway from which it goes in north-south direction and extends along Zhongxing Road until it crosses Yongjiang River and reaches its destination, Datong Bridge Station.

Opening timeline

Stations

References 

Rail Transit
Railway lines opened in 2019
2019 establishments in China